Hird Island is a private island located in McIntosh County, Georgia. It was historically used for the harvesting of lumber during the lumber boom of  Georgia in the 1800s. Today it hosts private homes along with a grass airstrip on the north end.

See also 
 Tidal Island

External links 
 Hird Island Facebook page

References 

Barrier islands of Georgia (U.S. state)
Islands of McIntosh County, Georgia
Private islands of the United States